Hans Hansen may refer to:

Painters
Hans Hansen (painter) (1920–1970), Faroese painter
Hans Hansen (portrait painter) (1769-1828), Danish painter

Politicians
Hans Christian Albert Hansen (1847–1925), Norwegian politician for the Conservative Party
H. C. Hansen (1906–1960), social democrat and Prime Minister of Denmark
Hans Nicolai Hansen (1835–1910), Danish politician, lawyer and speaker of the Landsting
Hans Ove Hansen (1904–1994), politician in Saskatchewan, Canada

Architects
Hans Christian Hansen (architect) (1803–1883), Danish architect mainly active in Athens and Copenhagen
Hans Hansen (architect) (1889–1966), German architect, member of the Glass Chain correspondence

Sportspeople
Hans Hansen (rower) (1915–2006), Norwegian competition rower and Olympic medalist
Hans Jørgen Hansen (1879–1966), Danish field hockey player
Hans Fróði Hansen (born 1975), football player from the Faroe Islands
Hans Trier Hansen (1893–1980), Danish Olympic gymnast
Hans Ewald Hansen (born 1944), Danish footballer
Hans Hansen (footballer)

Others
Hans Hansen (composer) (1817–1878), Danish composer
Hans A. Hansen (1872–1915), U.S. Navy sailor and Medal of Honor recipient
Hans Jacob Hansen (1855–1936), Danish zoologist
Hans Morten Hansen (born 1964), Norwegian stand-up comedian
Hans Peter Hansen (1829–1899), Danish xylographer
Hans Andrew Hansen (1968–   ), American horticulturist/plant breeder

See also
Hans Hansen Bergen (c. 1610–1654), settler of the Dutch colony of New Amsterdam
Hans Hanson (disambiguation)
Hans Hansson (disambiguation)